Triatoma infestans, commonly called winchuka or vinchuca in Argentina, Bolivia, Uruguay and Chile, barbeiro in Brazil, chipo in Venezuela and also known as "kissing bug" or "barber bug" in English, is a blood-sucking bug (like virtually all the members of its subfamily Triatominae) and the most important vector of   Trypanosoma cruzi which can lead to Chagas disease. It is widespread in the Southern Cone countries of South America. This region has joined the control intervention called Southern Cone Initiative managed by the PAHO.

During the Beagle survey voyage, Charles Darwin noted in his journal for 26 March 1835 having "experienced an attack, & it deserves no less a name, of the Benchuca, the great black bug of the Pampas. It is most disgusting to feel soft wingless insects, about an inch long, crawling over ones body; before sucking they are quite thin, but afterwards round & bloated with blood, & in this state they are easily squashed." Richard Keynes describes this Benchuca as being Triatoma infestans. Darwin is speculated to have died from chronic Chagas disease.

Distribution
T. infestans has both a wide range of habitats/ecologies and geographic areas it inhabits - the former being the reason for the latter.

Ecological distribution
In South America T. infestans is almost an exclusively domestic species, especially as a household pest in the Cochabamba Valley in Bolivia and parts of Paraguay and Argentina.

There remain a few freeliving populations in Argentina, Paraguay, and Brazil.

Tends to displace other Triatominae vectors of Chagas including Panstrongylus megistus, T. sordida, T. brasiliensis, and T. pseudomaculata.

Geographical distribution
Brazil (only widespread from 1955-1964, likely by immigrants from the south to Pernambuco, likely continuing to be spread by internal migration), El Salvador, Venezuela, Peru (anthropic transportation), Argentina (especially as a household pest in some areas), Paraguay (especially as a household pest in some areas).

Biology

Defecation
Defecation is central to the T. cruzi transmission cycle of Triatomines. There is no direct transmission by feeding, instead deposition of parasites is associated with a bloodmeal but occurs solely by defecation. Trumper and Gorla 1991 find transmission to be inversely correlated with vector density: Crowded areas tend to have T. infestans interrupting each other, and interrupted feedings do not provide as much as a completed bloodmeal. T. infestans is unlikely to defecate when not sated and so rarely transmits. Low vector density areas therefore have high rates of transmission.

See also
 Triatominae
 Triatoma protracta

References

External links

 Information on Triatoma infestans and other members of Triatominae, by Andreas Rose
 Information on Triatominae, by Fernando Otálora-Luna

Reduviidae
Insect vectors of human pathogens
Chagas disease
Fauna of Argentina
Fauna of Bolivia
Fauna of Chile
Fauna of Peru
Insects of South America
Insects described in 1834
Taxa named by Johann Christoph Friedrich Klug